The 1989 Bowling Green Falcons football team was an American football team that represented Bowling Green State University in the Mid-American Conference (MAC) during the 1989 NCAA Division I-A football season. In their fourth season under head coach Moe Ankney, the Falcons compiled a 5–6 record (5–3 against MAC opponents), finished in fifth place in the MAC, and were outscored by all opponents by a combined total of 319 to 233.

The team's statistical leaders included Rich Dackin with 2,679 passing yards, LeRoy Smith with 564 rushing yards, and Ronald Heard with 916 receiving yards.

Schedule

References

Bowling Green
Bowling Green Falcons football seasons
Bowling Green Falcons football